The Vereinsthaler was the currency of the two Grand Duchies of Mecklenburg-Schwerin and Mecklenburg-Strelitz between 1857 and 1873. It replaced the Mecklenburg Thaler at par and was replaced by the Mark at a rate of 1 Vereinsthaler = 3 Mark. The Vereinsthaler was subdivided into 48 Schillinge, each of 12 Pfenninge.

Currencies of Germany
1857 establishments in Germany
1873 disestablishments in Germany
19th-century economic history
1860s in Germany
History of Mecklenburg